Vladimir Ilyich Koptsov is a former Soviet and Kazakhstani professional ice hockey player and ice hockey coach. He played for Avangard Omsk and Torpedo Ust-Kamenogorsk at the Soviet Era. In 1994-95 season, he was in head coach role in Torpedo Ust-Kamenogorsk and Kazakhstan men's national ice hockey team. Koptsov was the assistant coach at the MHL team Snezhnye Barsy, during 2012-13 season.

Coaching career
1992 Soviet Union national junior's ice hockey team - head coach
1994-1995 Torpedo Ust-Kamenogorsk - head coach
1994-1995 Kazakhstan men's national ice hockey team - head coach
1995-1998 Avangard Omsk - assistant coach
1998-2000 Amur Khabarovsk - assistant coach
2002-2003 Amur Khabarovsk - assistant coach
2010-2013 Snezhnye Barsy - assistant coach

References

External links
Vladimir Koptsov's profile at the Kazzinc-Torpedo Fans Website

1950 births
Sportspeople from Oskemen
Avangard Omsk players
Kazakhstan men's national ice hockey team coaches
Kazakhstani ice hockey coaches
Kazakhstani ice hockey players
Kazzinc-Torpedo head coaches
Kazzinc-Torpedo players
Soviet ice hockey players
Living people